This is a list of flag bearers who have represented Iceland at the Olympics.

Flag bearers carry the national flag of their country at the opening ceremony of the Olympic Games.

See also
Iceland at the Olympics

References

Iceland at the Olympics
Iceland
Olympic flagbearers
Olympic flagbearers